Joymoti may refer to:

Person
 Joymoti Konwari, the wife of the Ahom prince, and later king, Gadapani.

Film
 Joymoti (1935 film), the first Assamese movie, by Jyoti Prasad Agarwala.
 Joymoti (2006 film), an Assamese film  by Manju Borah.

Drama
 Soti Joymoti (drama), by Lakhminath Bezbarua
 Joymoti (drama), by Birendra Kumar Bhattacharya